Abitibi Regional County Municipality is a regional county municipality in the Abitibi-Témiscamingue region of Quebec. The seat is Amos.

Subdivisions
There are 19 subdivisions within the RCM:

Cities & Towns (1)
 Amos

Municipalities (11)
 Barraute
 Berry
 Champneuf
 La Corne
 La Morandière-Rochebaucourt
 La Motte
 Preissac
 Saint-Dominique-du-Rosaire
 Saint-Félix-de-Dalquier
 Saint-Mathieu-d'Harricana
 Sainte-Gertrude-Manneville

Townships (3)
 Landrienne
 Launay
 Trécesson

Parishes (1)
 Saint-Marc-de-Figuery

Unorganized Territory (2)
 Lac-Chicobi
 Lac-Despinassy

Indian Reserves (1)
 Pikogan

Demographics

Population

Language

Transportation

Access Routes
Highways and numbered routes that run through the municipality, including external routes that start or finish at the county border:

 Autoroutes
 None

 Principal Highways
 
 

 Secondary Highways
 
 
 
 

 External Routes
 None

Protected areas
 Aiguebelle National Park

Attractions and other areas
 Alphonse-Normadin Covered Bridge [1950] (Saint-Dominique-du-Rosaire)
 Amos Airport (Trecesson)
 Exposition de la Maison de la culture Centre (Amos)
 Garde Dispensary (La Corne)
 Grazie Gadens (La Motte)
 l'Arche-de-Noe Covered Bridge [1937] (La Morandière-Rochebaucourt)
 l'Harricana Ferme d'autruches Slope (Saint-Mathieu-d'Harricana)
 l'Original Covered Bridge [1942] (La Morandière-Rochebaucourt)
 Mont-Video (Barraute)
 Pageau Refuge (Amos)
 Poste Museum (Saint-Marc-de-Figuery)

See also
 List of regional county municipalities and equivalent territories in Quebec

References